The Philippine Department (Filipino: Kagawaran ng Pilipinas/Hukbong Kagawaran ng Pilipinas) was a regular United States Army organization whose mission was to defend the Philippine Islands and train the Philippine Army. On 9 April 1942, during World War II, the organization surrendered to the Japanese. The department and its sub-units were predominantly under the command of American officers, including an American general, while the majority of the troops were enlisted Filipinos, known as the Philippine Scouts (PS). The primary force of this department was the Philippine Division. Of the 22,532 troops, 10,473 were members of the Philippine Division itself.

This unit was formally organized in 1913 and, on 26 July 1941, was attached to US Army Forces – Far East (USAFFE). Following the creation of USAFFE, the Philippine Department became, in effect, a corps area service and logistical command. Tactical command was permanently transferred to USAFFE's control.

The Philippine Department in 1914

General Headquarters:
Fort Santiago, Manila, Luzon

Troops:
Field Hospital No. 4
Ambulance Company Number 4
Headquarters, Company K, 3d Engineers
Headquarters, Company L, 3d Engineers
Company F, Signal Corps
Company L, Signal Corps
7th Cavalry Brigade
8th Cavalry Brigade
2nd Field Artillery Regiment (United States)
Coast Defenses of Manila and Subic Bays
8th Infantry Regiment
13th Infantry Regiment
24th Infantry Regiment
China Expedition - 15th Infantry

Commanders of the Philippine Department

US Army Troops – Philippines – 31 July 1941
At the time of USAFFE's formation the force consisted of 22,532 troops. Of the 1,340 officers, 775 were reservists. 7,293 troops were assigned to the infantry and 4,967 were assigned to the Harbor Defenses of Manila and Subic Bays. About 2,500 troops served in a service or supply position, mainly quartermaster or medical units. The majority of the department's troops were stationed on Luzon.

Total Strength: 22,532 (1,434 officers, 21,098 enlisted, including 11,937 Philippine Scouts).

USAFFE Headquarters, Manila (5)
Philippine Department Headquarters, Fort William McKinley (289)
Philippine Division (10,473)
26th Cavalry Regiment (PS) (838)
43d Infantry Regiment (PS) (329)
60th Coast Artillery AA 
86th Field Artillery Regiment (PS) (388)
88th Field Artillery Regiment (PS) (518)
808th Military Police Company (69)
Harbor Defenses of Manila and Subic Bays (5,360)
Philippine Army Air Corps (2,407)
Service Detachments (1,836)
Other (20)

Casualty count
Ref: American Battlefield Monuments Commission
{For reference only. PS=Philippine Scouts}

Philippine Forces

United States forces

The Marines were from the 4th Marines.

US Navy casualties/losses

Patch of the Philippine Department
All units of the department wore the Philippine Department shoulder sleeve insignia, with the exception of the Philippine Division, which wore their own patch: a golden carabao on a red shield.

Officially, the Philippine Department's insignia featured the Philippine Sea Lion, in white, superimposed on a blue oval with a height of 2.5 inches. The Sea Lion is derived from the coat of arms of Manila. The Philippine Department and Philippine Division insignia were both approved on 8 July 1922.

See also
Far East Air Force (United States)
Military history of the Philippines
Military history of the United States

References

Departments and districts of the United States Army
Military units and formations established in 1911
Military units and formations disestablished in 1942
Military history of the Philippines
Military history of the Philippines during World War II
Military units and formations of the United States in World War II
Department